Auckland City Football Club is a New Zealand semi-professional football club based in the suburb of Sandringham in Auckland, New Zealand. They currently compete in the Northern League. Auckland City have established themselves as a major force in both New Zealand and Oceania, having won eight New Zealand Football Championship titles and ten OFC Champions League titles since their foundation.

Formed in 2004 following the inception of the New Zealand Football Championship, Auckland City currently play their home matches at Kiwitea Street in Sandringham, New Zealand. The club is the most successful in Oceania, having won seven consecutive OFC Champions League titles between 2011 and 2017 – the most consecutive continental titles of any football team in history. This has resulted in Auckland becoming a regular fixture at the FIFA Club World Cup, famously achieving a third-placed finish in the 2014 edition. Auckland City's youth team formerly played in the National Youth League, becoming the most successful team in competition history with seven titles.

History

Auckland City has won the New Zealand Football Championship regular season twelve times, and the Grand Final eight times. They represented the Oceania Football Confederation (OFC) in the OFC Champions League, which they won most recently in 2017 for the ninth time (seventh in a row). With a third place in 2014, they also became the only OFC team to reach the semi-finals of the FIFA Club World Cup. They are also the only team to win the continental treble three times.

In 2017, Auckland City were invited to play in the Lunar New Year Cup, a friendly tournament hosted in Hong Kong. Auckland City defeated South Korean champions FC Seoul in the semifinal, before defeating Hong Kong side Kitchee in the final to lift the trophy. Auckland City were again invited for the 2019 edition, falling to Chinese Super League club Shandong Luneng 2–1.

Following the conclusion of the 2018–19 season, in which Auckland City won all but one game in their undefeated season but fell short in both the OFC Champions League and the league playoffs, long-term manager Ramon Tribulietx brought his association with the club to an end and was replaced by Team Wellington coach José Figueira ahead of the 2019–20 season.

After the first season of the New Zealand National League Auckland City finished 1st in the Northern League but didn't get to play in the championship phase due to COVID-19 affecting the Auckland Region. The club then announced that Albert Riera would take over as head coach for the next season.

FIFA Club World Cup
 2009

Auckland City overcame local champions Al Ahli 2–0 in the opening play-off match, with goals by Adam Dickinson and Chad Coombes. In their quarter final clash against CONCACAF champions Atlante of Mexico, the side lost 0–3.

The play-off for fifth and sixth place was described by coach Paul Posa as "the greatest night in the history of Auckland City Football Club", as the team defeated CAF Champions League winners TP Mazembe of the Democratic Republic of Congo 3–2. The goal scorers on this special occasion were Jason Hayne with two and Riki van Steeden.

These historic victories were the first recorded by a New Zealand team at the Club World Cup, and the first by an amateur side at this tournament. This was also the first time that a senior men's representative team from New Zealand has recorded a victory in a world FIFA competition.

 2014

Auckland City played Moroccan league champions Moghreb Tétouan in a play-off for the quarter-finals on 10 December. The match finished goalless, with Auckland winning 4–3 in a penalty shoot-out and qualifying for a quarter-final clash against AFC Champions League winners ES Sétif. Auckland City defeated ES Sétif 1–0, courtesy of a John Irving goal, and advanced to the semi-finals for the first time ever.

Auckland played Copa Libertadores champions San Lorenzo in the semifinals, but lost 2–1. A shock seemed possible when a second-half goal from Ángel Berlanga cancelled out Pablo Barrientos' first-half strike for San Lorenzo, but substitute Mauro Matos netted San Lorenzo's winner in extra time.

They finished the tournament with a historic 4-2 penalty shootout win over CONCACAF Champions League winners Cruz Azul in the third-place playoff after a 1–1 draw at full time, with substitute Sanni Issa scoring the ultimate penalty just days after signing for the club. The result gained the side worldwide acclaim, as the team of part-timers and amateurs defied all expectations in the competition. Club stalwart and defender Ivan Vicelich came third in the Golden Ball award for best player at the tournament, behind Cristiano Ronaldo and Sergio Ramos of Real Madrid.

Colours and badge

Auckland City's regular kit colours are faintly striped royal blue shirts and shorts with white socks. The current crest, in use since the club's inception, features the Sky Tower, an iconic Auckland landmark.

Stadium

Freyberg Field, then a public park, was made available for use as a football field in 1965 for tenants Central United. What became known as Kiwitea Street, was made available to Auckland City following their foundation in 2004. Since then, the amenities at Kiwitea Street have been overhauled, including a new clubrooms and a resurfaced pitch in 2007.

The stadium seats 250 spectators, with additional standing room.

Players

First-team squad

Club officials

Technical staff

Medical staff

Managers

Notable former players

The following players gained international caps for their respective countries. Players listed in bold represented their countries while playing for Auckland City.

  Teruo Iwamoto
  Keryn Jordan
  Grant Young
  Liam Jordan
  Lee Ki-hyung
  Micah Lea'alafa
  Henry Fa'arodo
  George Suri
  Roy Krishna
  Salesh Kumar
  Brian Kaltak
  David Browne
  James Pritchett
  Cole Peverley
  Paul Urlovic
  Nikko Boxall
  Michael Boxall
  Clayton Lewis
  Tim Payne
  Myer Bevan
  Jacob Spoonley
  Cameron Howieson
  Ian Hogg
  Tom Doyle
  Sean Douglas
  Adam McGeorge
  Jeff Campbell
  Dalton Wilkins
  Te Atawhai Hudson-Wihongi
  Liam Graham
  Tamati Williams
  Chad Coombes
  Dave Mulligan
  Ryan De Vries
  Ivan Vicelich
  Matthew Ridenton
  Moses Dyer
  Kris Bright
  Ross Nicholson
  Jonathan Perry
  Harshae Raniga
  Callum McCowatt
  Logan Rogerson

Season by season record

International competitions record

Continental

International

FIFA Club World Cup

Honours

Domestic
National League
Premiers (12): 2004–05, 2005–06, 2009–10, 2011–12, 2013–14, 2014–15, 2015–16, 2016–17, 2017–18, 2018–19, 2019–20†, 2020–21
Champions (9): 2005, 2006, 2007, 2009, 2014, 2015, 2018, 2020†, 2022

† Due to the COVID-19 pandemic, the 2019–20 season was concluded after 16 rounds. The remaining two rounds of the regular season and the finals series were cancelled. Auckland City, who were leading the regular season table, were declared champions and also awarded the Minor Premiership.

Northern League
Champions (2): 2021, 2022

Chatham Cup
Champions (1): 2022

ASB Charity Cup
Champions (7): 2011, 2013, 2015, 2016, 2018, 2019, 2020

National Youth League
Champions (5): 2007, 2009, 2012, 2013, 2017

International
 FIFA Club World Cup
Bronze Medal: 2014
OFC Champions League
Champions (10): 2006, 2009, 2011, 2012, 2013, 2014, 2015, 2016, 2017, 2022
OFC President's Cup
Champions: 2014

Friendlies
 Hong Kong Lunar New Year Cup
Champions: 2017

Notes

References

External links

Auckland City FC at Soccerway

 
Association football clubs in Auckland
Association football clubs established in 2004
2004 establishments in New Zealand
OFC Champions League winning clubs